Alloneuron is a genus of plant in family Melastomataceae. It contains the following species (shrubs or trees):
 Alloneuron glomeratum C.Ulloa & Michelang.
 Alloneuron liron B.Walln.
 Alloneuron majus (Markgr.) Markgr. ex J.F.Macbr.
 Alloneuron ronliesneri B.Walln.
 Alloneuron ulei Pilg.
Synonyms:

The new genus Wurdastom is described to include 8 species described by Wurdack, 
 Alloneuron bullatum Wurdack = Wurdastom bullata (Wurdack) B.Walln.
 Alloneuron cuatrecasasii Wurdack = Wurdastom cuatrecasasii (Wurdack) B.Walln.
 Alloneuron dorrii, Wurdack = Wurdastom dorrii (Wurdack) B.Walln. 
 Alloneuron dudleyi Wurdack = Wurdastom dudleyi (Wurdack) B.Walln.
 Alloneuron ecuadorense, Wurdack = Wurdastom ecuadorensis (Wurdack) B.Walln.
 Alloneuron hexamerum Wurdack = Wurdastom hexamera (Wurdack) B.Walln.
 Alloneuron sneidernii Wurdack = Wurdastom sneidernii (Wurdack) B.Walln.
 Alloneuron subglabrum Wurdack = Wurdastom subglabra (Wurdack) B.Walln.

References

 
Melastomataceae genera
Taxonomy articles created by Polbot
Taxa named by Robert Knud Friedrich Pilger